Overshoot is the unintended reception of microwave signals in microwave communication, occurring as a result of an unusual ionospheric conditions.

See also 
 Federal Standard 1037C
 MIL-STD-188

Microwave technology